Bolaji Simeon Sakin (born February 24, 1993) is a Nigerian football player currently with Guinean side Horoya AC.

Career

Youth 
Sakin was born in Abidjan, Côte d'Ivoire. At an early age, he arrived in Nigeria where he joined youth club Ijayapi Rock FC in Abuja.

Kwara United FC 
Sakin began his professional career with Kwara United F.C. during the 2011/2012 season.

Wikki Tourists 
Simeon than joined Wikki Tourists during the 2012/2013 season and joined Dolphins F.C. after a season.

Abia Warriors FC 
Simeon joined Abia Warriors FC in January 2015 where he was instrumental at the club and attracted interest from rivals Rivers United FC.

Rivers United FC
On 1 January 2017, Sakin signed for Nigeria Professional Football League side Rivers United FC for an undisclosed fee, agreeing a two-year contract with the club.

While at Rivers United he appeared in the 2017 CAF Confederations Cup, scoring goals against Uganda's KCCA and Morocco's FUS Rabat in otherwise losing efforts.

Horoya AC
On 12 November 2017, it was announced that Sakin had signed a 4-year contract at Guinean club Horoya AC.

He scored his first goal in CAF Champions League on August 17, 2018 against AS Togo-Port in 2018 CAF Champions League group stage.

Honours 
 Ligue 1 Nimba Mining : 2018
 Guinée Coupe Nationale : 2018
 Guinée Super Cup : 2018

References 

1993 births
Living people
Nigerian footballers
Nigerian expatriate footballers
Expatriate footballers in Guinea
Rivers United F.C. players
Horoya AC players
Association football forwards
Abia Warriors F.C. players
Nigerian expatriate sportspeople in Guinea
Guinée Championnat National players